Payner LTD is an independent Bulgarian record label and production company. It was founded in 1990 by Bulgarian businessman Mitko Dimitrov. It is the biggest record label in the country with 80 artists currently signed in their roster. Originally Payner started with the production of audio and videotapes for the Bulgarian market and for exportations abroad. As of today, the company owns their own record studio, founded in 1995. 3 television channels -  Planeta TV since 2001, Planeta Folk since 2007, and Planeta HD since 2010.
As well as 2 complexes - "Prikazkite" in Harmanli. Bulgaria and "Planeta Payner" in Dimitrovgrad.

Production facilities and the head office of Payner LTD are situated in Dimitrovgrad.

Artists

References

External links 
 www.payner.bg - Official website
 www.planeta.tv - Planeta TV's Official website
 Planeta TV's's Official Facebook page
 Planeta TV's Official YouTube channel

Bulgarian record labels
Record labels established in 1990
Bulgarian companies established in 1990